Shartaq-e Yek (also Romanized as Shartāq-e Yek) is a village in Jahad Rural District, Hamidiyeh District, Ahvaz County, Khuzestan Province, Iran. At the 2006 census, its population was 173, in 32 families.

References 

Populated places in Ahvaz County